Betulio Segundo González (born October 24, 1949) is a former boxer from Venezuela, who is considered a national hero in Venezuela. He is considered by many to be Venezuela's greatest world champion in boxing history. A combatant of 91 bouts, he fought until eleven months before he turned forty, the mandatory age for professional fighters to retire in Venezuela.

A native of Maracaibo, Zulia State he made his professional boxing debut on April 24, 1968, knocking out Elio Monzat in the third round at Gonzalez's hometown. Gonzalez won his first ten fights, including his Caracas debut, on November 25 of that same year, with a ten-round decision over Evencio Bruguillos.

On August 1, 1969, his winning streak came to a halt, when he was held to a ten-round draw (tie), by Juan José Brizuela in Caracas. He beat Brizuela by a ten-round decision in a September 16 rematch, then challenged Hector Criollo for the Venezuelan Flyweight title on October 10. He won his first belt by knocking out Criollo in seven rounds to win the regional title.

On March 6, 1970, he suffered a somewhat surprising defeat, at the hands of Felix Marquez, who had only five prior professional fights. He was knocked out by Marquez in six rounds. He followed this with a win over Marquez by 12 rounds split decision to retain the Venezuelan flyweight title in a rematch as well as a win over Nestor Jimenez and a loss to Ignacio Espinal; both Jimenez and Espinal would later go on to fight for world titles.

On April 1, 1971, he got his first world title try, in what also was his first fight abroad. Fighting Masao Ohba in Tokyo for the WBA world Flyweight title, he dropped a fifteen-round unanimous decision.

After three more wins, he had his second chance at a world title: on November 20, he faced former world champion Erbito Salavarria for the WBC's vacant world title. The fight resulted in a controversial fifteen-round draw: The Zulia State boxing commission alleged that Salavarria had been given sugar or illegal drugs during the fight, and sent the WBC a bottle with which the sugar or drugs had supposedly been administered. The WBC recognized Gonzalez to be as world champion.

He lost the title in his first defense, being handed a tenth-round knockout by Venice Borkhorsor on September 29 at Bangkok.

Gonzalez had four wins in a row after that loss, and, on August 4, 1973, he became a world Flyweight champion for the second time, when he claimed the vacant WBA title by defeating Miguel Canto by a fifteen-round majority decision in Maracaibo.

On November 17, he retained the title with an eleventh-round knockout over Alberto Morales. On May 19, 1974, he faced Shoji Oguma, another world champion boxer, in a non-title, ten round bout held at Tokyo. Gonzalez prevailed by a ten-round decision. On July 20, Gonzalez fought in Italy against Franco Udella, a world Jr. Flyweight champion, and he retained the WBA world Flyweight title with a tenth-round knockout.

Oguma became the WBA world Flyweight champion when he beat Gonzalez, on November 1, with a fifteen-round split decision in Tokyo.

After one more win, Gonzalez and Canto met, this time with Canto as WBC world champion. Canto defeated Gonzalez by a fifteen-round split decision on May 24, 1975 at Monterrey, Mexico.

Gonzalez then won eight fights in a row, before fighting for the Fecarbox regional Flyweight title. On June 20, 1976, he won that title by knocking out Hildo Roche in two rounds. On November 10, he and Canto had a third match; Canto retained the WBC world Flyweight title with a fifteen-round split decision, in a fight held at Caracas.

Gonzalez won eight more fights in a row before being given another chance at becoming world Flyweight champion. On August 12, 1978, he joined the exclusive group of boxers who have become world champions three times in the same division, by defeating Guty Espadas by a fifteen-round majority decision in Caracas. This fight proved controversial as well, as Gonzalez appeared to be knocked down in the last round, but the fight's referee chose not to count it as a knockdown.

On November 4, he retained the title against the famed but maligned Chilean fighter Martin Vargas, a national hero in his country himself, with a twelfth-round knockout. Then, he and Oguma proceeded to have a third encounter, and, on January 1, 1979, they fought to a fifteen-round draw in Hamamatsu.

Gonzalez returned to Japan in July 1979, where, on July 6, he avenged his previous defeat to Oguma, by retaining the title with a twelfth-round knockout. But in his next defense, against Luis Ibarra, he lost a fifteen-round decision and the world title on November 17.

Gonzalez then embarked on another winning streak, which reached seven victories in a row, including two knockouts over future world champion Peter Mathebula, in ten and six rounds, respectively. This winning streak stopped when he challenged Juan Herrera for the WBA world Flyweight title on December 19, 1981. Trying to become a world Flyweight champion for the fourth time, Gonzalez was knocked out in seven rounds.

Santos Laciar went on to beat Herrera for the WBA world title, and, after Gonzalez got another win, the two boxing legends met, on September 14, 1982, at a Maracaibo hotel. In what turned out to be his last try at becoming world Flyweight champion for the fourth time, Gonzalez lost a split decision to the Argentine boxer.

After losing by a twelve-round decision to Alberto Castro for the Fedelatin Flyweight title on July 7, 1984, Gonzalez announced his retirement for the first time.

In 1988, however, he returned to boxing for one more fight: having lost on November 28 to future world champion Rodolfo Blanco by knockout in eight rounds, he retired, eleven months before mandatory retirement in Venezuela.

Gonzalez retired with a record of 76 wins, 12 losses and 3 draws, with 48 wins by knockout.

He became a household name all over Latin America during his tenures as world champion, especially after the Spanish boxing magazines Ring En Español and Guantes helped popularize him.

External links

1949 births
Living people
Sportspeople from Maracaibo
Flyweight boxers
World boxing champions
World flyweight boxing champions
World Boxing Council champions
Venezuelan male boxers
20th-century Venezuelan people
21st-century Venezuelan people